Homeobox protein Hox-D1 is a protein that in humans is encoded by the HOXD1 gene.

This gene is a member of the Antp homeobox family and encodes a protein with a homeobox DNA-binding domain. This nuclear protein functions as a sequence-specific transcription factor that is involved in differentiation and limb development. Mutations in this gene have been associated with severe developmental defects on the anterior-posterior (a-p) limb axis.

See also
 Homeobox

References

Further reading

External links 
 

Transcription factors